The 2020 Eastern Michigan Eagles football team represented Eastern Michigan University during the 2020 NCAA Division I FBS football season. The Eagles were led by seventh-year head coach Chris Creighton and played their home games at Rynearson Stadium in Ypsilanti, Michigan. They competed as members of the West Division of the Mid-American Conference (MAC).

Previous season
The Eagles finished the 2019 season 6–7, 3–5 in MAC play to finish in a tie for fifth place in the West Division, losing the tiebreaker to Toledo. They were invited to the Quick Lane Bowl where they lost to Pittsburgh 30–34.

Preseason

Award watch lists
Listed in the order that they were released

Preseason media poll

Schedule
Eastern Michigan had games against Kentucky and Missouri, which were canceled due to the COVID-19 pandemic.

References

Eastern Michigan
Eastern Michigan Eagles football seasons
Eastern Michigan Eagles football